Mątowy Wielkie  (formerly German Groß Montau) is a village in the administrative district of Gmina Miłoradz, within Malbork County, Pomeranian Voivodeship, in northern Poland. The village has a population of 353.

The town was, in 1347, the birthplace of Saint Dorothea of Montau. Thus, a 14th-century Gothic church is located in the village which is located close to the Malbork Castle (Ordensburg Marienburg), the then the capital of the Teutonic Order's monastic state. Before 1772 the area was part of Kingdom of Poland, 1772-1919 Prussia and Germany, 1920-1939 Free City of Danzig, September 1939 - February 1945 Nazi Germany. In 1945 returned to Poland. For the history of the region, see History of Pomerania.

References
Stargardt, Ute (ed.), 1997. "The life of Dorothea von Montau, a fourteenth-century recluse" (original text by Johannes of Marienwerder, d. 1417). Lewiston: E. Mellen Press. 

Villages in Malbork County